Burnley FC Women is an English women's football club from Burnley, Lancashire, affiliated with Burnley Football Club. From its inception in 1995 until 2018 it was known as Burnley FC Girls and Ladies.

History 
Burnley FC Girls & Ladies was founded in 1995 by John Lister, just too late for hometown girl and former England international goalkeeper Rachel Brown-Finnis to join as a child. The club initially consisted of 15 ladies, who trained in the old sports barn at Turf Moor and played their home games at the club's training facility at Gawthorpe. Following the demise of the Lancashire League, the team joined the North West Women's Regional League.

The club established a junior set-up from the outset. An Under 10s side was formed by Grahame Meeks and Peter Cooper shortly after the first-team was founded. The youth set-up was grassroots for many years, to encourage players of all ages and abilities to take-up football, including England youth international Naomi Hartley.

At the end of the 2016–17 season, the management and operation of the club was transferred to Burnley FC in the Community. The following season, in the 2017–18 FA Women's Cup, the team won three preliminary round games to qualify for the first round proper for the first time in their history. Burnley reached the third round, where they were eliminated by third-tier side Cardiff City. Burnley were promoted to the FA Women's National League Division One North at the end of the same season. In 2018, the club was rebranded as Burnley FC Women, and for the first time players of all ages were required to negotiate trials to represent the club. In the 2018–19 season, the team won the league title and were promoted to the FA Women's National League North, the third tier in English women's football.

In February 2021, it was announced that the women's team would be integrated into Burnley F.C., as the club's new American owner Alan Pace sought to turn the women's team professional. In December, the club announced that first team manager Matt Bee would be leaving "as Burnley FC Women continue transitioning to a more professional level."

Players

First-team squad 

 (Captain)

Manager: Jonathan Morgan

Honours 
Women's National League
 Division One North
Winners (1): 2018–19

North West Women's Regional Football League
 Premier Division
Winners (1): 2017–18
 Division Two
Winners (1): 2004–05
 Division Three
Winners (1): 2003–04

References

External links 
 Burnley F.C. Women Official Website

Women's football clubs in England
Burnley F.C.
1995 establishments in England
Association football clubs established in 1995